The Salathé Wall is one of the original technical climbing routes up El Capitan, a  high granite monolith in Yosemite National Park.  The Salathé Wall was named by Yvon Chouinard in honor of John Salathé, a pioneer of rock climbing in Yosemite.  The route is recognized in the historic climbing text Fifty Classic Climbs of North America and considered a classic around the world.

Climbing history

It was first ascended in 1961 by Royal Robbins, Tom Frost, and Chuck Pratt.  After climbing about a quarter of the route, they retreated to re-supply, leaving four fixed ropes in place.  Quickly returning, they jumared back up the ropes and totally committed to climbing the upper wall in a single push, which they did in 6 days using only 15 bolts total.  The route was about 25% free climbing with sections of run-out 5.9, and the direct aid was also difficult (A4).  A year later, Robbins and Frost returned and did the route in a single push from the bottom.

In 1972, Peter Haan became the first to climb the route alone, rope solo, using pitons for aid and protection. It was his first Big Wall climb.

In 1975, Kevin Worral and Mike Graham, starting from the Nose route, traversed left a bit to join this route and free climbed pitches 4 through 10 of Salathe Wall Route up to Mammoth Terraces, adding three pitches of 5.11.  A little later, John Long, and John Bachar free climbed pitch three (5.11b) making all 10 pitches free.  These ten free pitches, often free climbed as a short route, are commonly known as "Free Blast".

In 1979, Mark Hudon and Max Jones, climbing ground up, led and followed 95% of the route free, adding three pitches of 5.12 and 5 or 6 of 5.11.

In 1988, Todd Skinner and Paul Piana were the first to free climb all the sections (each climber free climbed only about half of the route, with 2 hanging belays for resting) during a nine-day push, after thirty days of working the route (graded 5.13c by the Yosemite Decimal System).  This was the first major El Capitan route to be free climbed.  In 1995 Alexander Huber was, after much work, the first individual to free climb all the pitches (5.13b), leading every pitch free himself in a single push (with one hanging belay for a rest), although he bypassed the hardest of the three cruxes by an easier free variation.  

In 2002, Yuji Hirayama made the first redpoint, in a single push avoiding all hanging belays, at 5.13d. 

In 2005, Steph Davis made the first female ascent at 5.13b.

References

External links 
Supertopo.com
Rockclimbing.com
Mountainproject.com

Climbing routes
Yosemite National Park